Saint Edward, Saint Edward's, St. Edward and St. Edward's may refer to:

People
 Saint Edward the Confessor (1004–1066), canonised 1161, feast day 13 October
 Saint Edward the Martyr (c. 962 – 978/979), canonised 1001, feast day 18 March

Education

United Kingdom
St Edward's School, Oxford, a co-educational boarding school located in North Oxford
St. Edward's College, a college located in Liverpool
St. Edward's School, Cheltenham, a secondary school located in Cheltenham
St. Edwards Church of England School, a secondary school located in Romford

United States
Saint Edward Catholic School (Lowell, Indiana), an elementary school located in Lowell, Indiana
Saint Edwards School, a college preparatory high school located in Vero Beach, Florida
St. Edward High School (Lakewood, Ohio), a boys-only college preparatory high school located in Lakewood, Ohio
St. Edward Seminary, a seminary formerly located in Kenmore, Washington
St. Edward's University, an institution of higher education in Austin, Texas
St. Edward's Hall (University of Notre Dame), located at the University of Notre Dame in Notre Dame, Indiana

Elsewhere
St. Edward's College, Malta, a boys' school in Cottonera, Malta
St. Edward's School, Shimla, a boy's convent school in Himachal Pradesh, India

Places
St. Edwards Church (Little Rock, Arkansas), listed on the National Register of Historic Places listings in Little Rock, Arkansas
St. Edward's Church, a Norman church in Stow-on-the-Wold
St. Edward, Nebraska, a city located in Boone County, Nebraska
Saint Edward Catholic Church, Pembroke Pines, located in Pembroke Pines, Florida
Saint Edward State Park, a park located in Kenmore, Washington
Church of St Edward, King of the West Saxons, a 15th century church in Eggbuckland, Plymouth

Other uses
St. Edward's Crown, used at the coronation of the British Monarch
St. Edward's Chair, alternate name for King Edward's Chair, used at the British Coronation

See also
 Saint Edouard (disambiguation)